David Wayne Parks (December 25, 1941 – August 8, 2019) was an American football wide receiver and tight end in the NFL. He was the first overall selection in the 1964 NFL Draft out of Texas Technological College (now Texas Tech University). Parks was selected to three Pro Bowls, and was an All-Pro selection two times. In 1965 he captured the "triple crown" of receiving, leading the NFL in receptions, receiving yards, and receiving touchdowns. In 2008 Parks was selected to be enshrined in the College Football Hall of Fame.

Career

High school

Parks attended Abilene High School (Abilene, Texas) and played for head coach Chuck Moser.

College

Parks played at the college level for the Texas Tech Red Raiders from 1961-1963. While at Texas Tech, Parks set several school records and earned many accolades. During his junior season in 1962, Parks was named an All-Southwest Conference selection.

Following his final season in 1963, Parks became the first player in Texas Tech history to be named an Associated Press All-American, and also earned selections from Sporting News, Time, Boston Recorder-American, Sports Extra, the American Football Coaches Association, and Football Weekly. Additionally, Parks received invitations to the East West Shrine Game, the Senior Bowl, and the Coaches All-America Game.

Upon his graduation, Parks held the school records for career receptions (80), single-season receptions (32), single game receptions (8 vs. Kansas State in 1963), and single game receiving yards (132 vs Kansas State in 1963). His record for longest interception return of 98 yards that occurred during a 1962 game versus Colorado still remains a school record. 

Parks was one of only five Texas Tech players to have their jerseys retired and along with E.J. Holub, Donny Anderson, Gabe Rivera, and Zach Thomas. He was named to the inaugural class of the Texas Tech Ring of Honor, which honors the players by engraving their names into a ring around Jones AT&T Stadium, and has been the only Red Raider selected as the 1st overall pick of the NFL Draft.

Parks was voted into the College Football Hall of Fame in 2008, joining fellow Red Raiders Donny Anderson, Hub Bechtol, E. J. Holub, and Gabriel Rivera.  Parks was also inducted into the Texas Sports Hall of Fame in 2012.

NFL
Parks was the first overall selection of the 1964 NFL Draft by the San Francisco 49ers. He was one of only three people to be drafted No. 1 as a wide receiver, alongside Irving Fryar in 1984 and Keyshawn Johnson in 1996. Six games into his rookie season, Parks set a franchise record for longest reception with an 83-yard catch, followed by the team's second longest reception, an 80-yarder, a week later. Both records stood for 13 years. In 1965, Parks, achieved the receiving triple crown, leading the National Football League in receptions with 80, receiving yards with 1,344, and receiving touchdowns with 12. For his performance, Parks was selected to the 1965 Pro Bowl and was named to the 1965 All-Pro Team.

Parks was named to the 1966 All-Pro Team and went on to attend the 1966 Pro Bowl and the 1967 Pro Bowl. Following the 1967 season, Parks utilized his option and left San Francisco for the New Orleans Saints, where he spent five seasons. In 1973, he played for the Houston Oilers, and retired after the season. He ended his career with 360 receptions, 5,619 receiving yards, a 15.6 average, and 44 touchdowns.

Personal life
He lived in Austin, Texas, and served as the associate director of the Texas Ranger Law Enforcement Organization. Parks would go on to invent the 'Speedy Weedy', a lawn and garden tool. Parks died on August 7, 2019, aged 77.

References

1941 births
2019 deaths
Abilene High School (Abilene, Texas) alumni
Players of American football from Texas
American football wide receivers
San Francisco 49ers players
New Orleans Saints players
Houston Oilers players
Western Conference Pro Bowl players
Texas Tech Red Raiders football players
National Football League first-overall draft picks
College Football Hall of Fame inductees
People from Muenster, Texas
All-American college football players
21st-century American inventors
Southern California Sun players